CSA Steaua București, is a volleyball club based in Bucharest, Romania, that competes in the CEV Challenge Cup.

Honours
Divizia A1
 Winners (16): 1951, 1952, 1954, 1957, 1967, 1968, 1969, 1970, 1971, 1978, 1986, 1987, 1988, 1989, 1990, 1991
CEV Champions League
 Runners Up (2): 1969, 1979
CEV Cup
 Runners Up (3): 1977, 1981, 1986

Team

Current squad
Squad for the 2018-19 season     
  Ovidiu Darlaczi
  Nicolas Grigorie 
  Gheorghe Ilie
  Andrei Ana
  Cornel Miron
  George Gavriz
  Michaël Parkinson
  Karli Allik
  Ialisson César Mello de Amorin 
  Caio de Prá
  Daniel Szaniawski 
  Maximilian Thaller
  Dávid Csanád

See also
 Romania men's national volleyball team

References

External links 
 
 CEV profile 

 

Romanian volleyball clubs
Volleyball
Sport in Bucharest 
1947 establishments in Romania